FIFA World Cup Qatar 2022 Official Soundtrack is a compilation album with various artists released in 2022. This album is the official music album of the  2022 FIFA World Cup held in Qatar.

History 
For the first time, a multi-song FIFA World Cup official soundtrack has been released, instead of one official song. The first song of the album is "Hayya Hayya (Better Together)", performed by Trinidad Cardona, Davido and AISHA, released on 1 April 2022 along with the music video. The second song is "Arhbo", performed by Gims and Ozuna, released on 19 August 2022 along with the music video.

The third song is "The World Is Yours to Take" performed by American rapper Lil Baby, teamed up with Budweiser, released on 23 September 2022 along with the music video.The fourth song is "Light The Sky" performed by Nora Fatehi, Manal, Rahma Riad and Balqees, composed by RedOne and released on 7 October 2022 along with the music video.

A fifth song, "Tukoh Taka", performed by Nicki Minaj, Maluma and Myriam Fares, was released on 17 November 2022 along with the music video, serving as the official song of the FIFA Fan Festival. The final song is "Dreamers" by Jungkook of BTS released on 20 November 2022. It was performed with Fahad Al-Kubaisi during the tournament's opening ceremony.

Track listing

See also
List of FIFA World Cup songs and anthems

References

2022 compilation albums
FIFA World Cup albums
2022 FIFA World Cup